Oadby and Wigston is a local government district and borough in the county of Leicestershire, England. It was formed in 1974, under the Local Government Act 1972, from the merger of the Oadby and Wigston urban districts. The population of the district at the 2011 census was 56,170. The district forms part of the Harborough constituency.

Geography
It is composed of the areas of Oadby, Wigston Magna, South Wigston and the hamlet of Kilby Bridge. It is predominantly urban, and borders Leicester directly to the north-west. There are no civil parishes in the district.

The most northerly corner is near the junction of the A6030 and B582, and near the Bupa hospital it meets Harborough. It runs along the B582 then along the former Roman road (which runs to Corby), passing the playing fields of the University of Leicester. It passes along the north edge of Oadby Lodge, a farm owned by the Co-op. Towards the deserted village of Stretton Magna (outside the district), the boundary passes southwestwards. This area was proposed to be the site of the eco-town Pennbury. It crosses the A6 at Glen Gorse Golf Club. It crosses Newton Lane and the Midland Main Line. It crosses the Grand Union Canal, and towards Kilby it meets the district of Blaby at the River Sence. It follows the River Sence, crossing the A5199 (Welford Road). At Rose Farm it follows Countesthorpe Road towards South Wigston, to the Grand Union Canal, crossing the former Midland Counties Railway, which it follows westwards. It passes northwards across St Thomas Road (B582) and the Birmingham to Peterborough Line. It passes northwards on the east side of the Glen Parva prison (in Blaby district). It meets Leicester UA south of Eyres Monsell, a large housing estate.

Following the Leicester boundary, it crosses Saffron Road (B5366), then follows Dorset Avenue, follows the Midland Main Line northwards, crossing Aylestone Lane (B5418), then crosses the Midland Main Line. It crosses the Welford Road (A5199) at the point where the road becomes a dual-carriageway south of the Best Western Leicester Stage Hotel (in Leicester UA). It passes on the south edge of Knighton Park, and the western edge of Oadby Golf Club, west of Leicester Racecourse (in the district). Near the racecourse entrance it crosses the A563 southern ring road, then London Road (A6), passing northwards along the western edge of the University of Leicester's Oadby Student Village, west of the University of Leicester Botanic Garden (in the district).

Demographics

Political control

The current composition of the council is:

The Conservatives held a majority of seats on the council from its creation in 1973 until 1991. The Liberal Democrats first won a majority in 1991 and have retained control since then. The current leader and deputy leader of the council are John Boyce and Samia Haq.

Education
Both Beauchamp College,  in the south of Oadby, and Wigston College, on the B582 in Wigston, are former grammar schools. Both are upper schools, as the three tier system operates in the district's schools. Also near the council offices on the B582 is South Leicestershire College, an FE college. Next to the Beauchamp College is the Gartree High School, a middle school. Another school is Manor High School, Oadby, the largest middle school in the country.

Arms

Freedom of the borough
The following people, military units and Organisations have received the Freedom of the Borough of Oadby and Wigston.

Individuals
 H. Embacher: 1988.

Military units
 The Royal Anglian Regiment: 2011.
 B Squadron Leicestershire and Derbyshire Yeomanry, Royal Yeomanry: 17 April 2012.

Organisations and groups
 The University of Leicester: 30 March 2021.

Gallery

References

External links
 Community Action
 Athletics club
 Leicestershire Villages

 
Non-metropolitan districts of Leicestershire
Boroughs in England